Mandarin Oriental Hyde Park, London, is a five-star hotel, located in the Knightsbridge area of London, owned and managed by Mandarin Oriental Hotel Group. Housed in a historic, Edwardian-style building, the hotel originally opened in 1908 as the Hyde Park Hotel and in 1996 the Mandarin Oriental Hotel Group purchased the property and conducted a full renovation, consequently re-opening in May 2000.

In June 2018, Mandarin Oriental Hyde Park, London, completed the most extensive restoration in its 115-year history. The hotel was damaged in a fire on 6 June 2018 which was mainly confined to the exterior courtyard area of the hotel with limited impact on the interiors and was temporarily closed.

History
The building was constructed in 1882 by the architects Archer and Green, and was originally designed as an apartment block. Although it faced onto Hyde Park, Queen Victoria did not permit the north entrance onto the park to be signed. The southern entrance onto Knightsbridge became the main one used by the public, while the northern was reserved for the Royal Family. The apartments caught fire in 1904, and after refurbishment, were converted into a hotel in 1908.

Between 1911 and 1912, the Ballroom was redecorated in the style of Louis XVI.  In 1925, the architects Charles Frédéric Mewès and Arthur Joseph Davis, who also remodelled some of the principal rooms in a traditional Louis XV style, added a Palm Court.

The hotel was visited by several Royals, including Queen Mary (wife of George V) and Edward VIII. Max Aitken, 1st Baron Beaverbrook, was staying at the hotel in 1916 when he was offered the peerage. Several silent film stars frequented the hotel, including Rudolph Valentino.

Mandarin Oriental Hyde Park, London

Mandarin Oriental Hotel Group purchased the property in 1996 and conducted a complete £57 million renovation of the hotel, as well as a re-design of the restaurants and bar. Mandarin Oriental Hyde Park, London, re-opened in May 2000. In June 2018 an extensive restoration of Mandarin Oriental Hyde Park, London, was completed. Internationally renowned designer, Joyce Wang, oversaw the redesign of the rooms, suites and public areas.

On 6 June 2018, a fire broke out at the hotel, believed to have been caused by welding work, but no staff or guests were injured. The hotel temporarily closed for six months.

In December 2018, the public areas of the hotel including all of their bars and restaurants reopened in time for Christmas. On 15 April 2019 the hotel reopened to full service with all rooms and suites reopened and ready to use.

A royal entrance
As a private 'Gentleman's Club' the entrance to the building was through the Loggia, but in 1902, when it reopened as Hyde Park Hotel, the postal address changed from Albert Gate to 66 Knightsbridge. Tradition has it that the Queen would not allow any form of advertising within the Park, and therefore insisted that the main entrance, with the hotel's name above it, be moved from the Park side to Knightsbridge. The Queen consequently mandated that the original entrance be preserved for Royal use, unless permission is otherwise granted by the Royal Household, which has been upheld ever since. The doors were opened during the coronation of King George VI and Queen Elizabeth in 1937 when the Crown gave special permission for the guests to use the park entrance.

Today, guests of Mandarin Oriental Hyde Park, London, can still take part in this tradition of the hotel by requesting permission from the Royal Parks to use the ‘Royal Entrance’ for special occasions. Guests who have been granted access to this entrance include members of the Japanese Imperial family, former South African Premier General Hertzog, and a President of Uganda.

Noteworthy events
Many important events have been held at the Hyde Park Hotel. A few such events were Lady Doris Vyner's silver wedding party in 1948, with the King and Queen as guests of honour, and the Balaclava Ball, hosted by the five cavalry regiments who had taken part in the Balaclava charge, also attended by the Queen, Prince Philip, and the late Queen Mother.

Other celebrations include the 1992 production of “Pavarotti in the Park”, one of the country's largest open-air concerts, the 1995 Anniversary of VE Day in which seven Heads of State and their delegations took up residence, and ‘Party in the Park’, one of Europe's largest music events. The hotel hosted the 80th birthday party of Margaret Thatcher which was attended by Elizabeth II and Prince Philip, Duke of Edinburgh, along with former Prime Ministers John Major and Tony Blair, former deputy chairman of the Conservative Party Jeffrey Archer and entertainers Shirley Bassey and Joan Collins among others.

Restaurants and bar 
The interiors of the restaurants and bar were created by the designer Adam Tihany. The hotel is home to three restaurants: Dinner by Heston Blumenthal, The Aubrey, and The Rosebery Lounge, as well as the Mandarin Bar.

See also
 Mandarin Oriental, Hong Kong
 Mandarin Oriental, Bangkok
 Mandarin Oriental, New York
 Mandarin Oriental, Miami

References
Citations

Sources

Mandarin Oriental Hotel Group
Hotels in London
Michelin Guide starred restaurants in the United Kingdom
Hotel buildings completed in 1902
Restaurants in London